Simona Păuca (born 19 September 1969) is a retired Romanian artistic gymnast. She competed at the 1984 Summer Olympics in Los Angeles, where she tied for gold with her teammate Ecaterina Szabo on balance beam with a difficult and innovative routine; she also won a team gold medal and a bronze medal all-around. After retiring from competitions she worked as a youth coach at her native club Dinamo București.

References

External links

1969 births
Living people
Romanian female artistic gymnasts
Gymnasts at the 1984 Summer Olympics
Olympic gymnasts of Romania
Olympic gold medalists for Romania
Olympic bronze medalists for Romania
Olympic medalists in gymnastics
Medalists at the 1984 Summer Olympics
20th-century Romanian women
People from Azuga